Dasara is an 2023 upcoming Indian Telugu-language period action adventure film written and directed by debutant Srikanth Odela, a protégé of Sukumar. It stars Nani and Keerthy Suresh. The film is set in the backdrop of Singareni coal mines near Godavarikhani of Telangana.

The film was announced in October 2021 with principal photography commencing in March 2022. The film has music composed by Santhosh Narayanan. Dasara is scheduled for a theatrical release on 30 March 2023.

Premise 
Dharani is an young ruffian from Veerlapally, who steals coal and boozes alcohol with his friends. One day, Dharani is blamed for an unexpected incident by Chinna Nambi and his gang where he sets out to vanquish them.

Cast 

 Nani as Dharani
 Dheekshith Shetty as Suri
 Keerthy Suresh as Vennela
 Samuthirakani as Shivanna
 Shine Tom Chacko as Chinna Nambi
 Sai Kumar as Rajanna
 Shamna Kasim
 Zarina Wahab

Production

Development 
In October 2021, actor Nani next project was announced with the title Dasara under the direction of debutant Srikanth Odela, who assisted Sukumar in Nannaku Prematho and Rangasthalam. It is produced by Sudhakar Cherukuri under his banner, Sri Lakshmi Venkateswara Cinemas. The film was formally launched in February 2022.

Nani described Dasara as "pure raw, rustic, and adrenaline-rush of a film."  The film is set in the backdrop of Singareni coal mines near Godavarikhani in Telangana.

Casting 
Keerthy Suresh was cast as the female lead opposite Nani, which marks her second collaboration with him after Nenu Local, while other actors and actresses like Samuthirakani, Prakash Raj, Rajendra Prasad, Roshan Mathew, Sai Kumar, Zarina Wahab were signed on to play pivotal roles.

Filming 
Principal photography commenced in March 2022. In April 2022, the makers shifted to Hyderabad to shoot a song. In July 2022, the third schedule commenced.

Music
The film score and soundtrack album of the film is composed by Santhosh Narayanan. The music rights were acquired by Saregama. The first single titled "Dhoom Dhaam Dhosthaan" was released on 3 October 2022. The single "Dhoom Dhaam Dhosthaan" opened to positive reviews from many critics mainly praising the makeover of Nani and Santhosh Narayanan's unique composition. The second single titled "Ori Vaari" was released on 13 February 2023. The third single titled "Chamkeela Angeelesi" was released on 8 March 2023.

Release

Theatrical
Dasara is scheduled for a theatrical release on 30 March 2023. It is planned to be released in Telugu in addition to dubbed versions in Tamil, Kannada, Malayalam, and Hindi languages.The teaser of the film was released on 30 January 2023. The trailer of the film was released on 14 March 2023.

Home media
Digital distribution rights of the film have been acquired by Netflix.

Distribution
The film will be distributed by AA Films and Star Studios.

References

External links 
 

Upcoming Indian films
Upcoming Telugu-language films
Indian action drama films
Upcoming films
Films shot in Telangana
Films set in Telangana